Shamrock Hill is a 1949 American musical comedy film directed by Arthur Dreifuss, starring Peggy Ryan, Ray McDonald and Trudy Marshall.

The film's sets were designed by the art director Charles D. Hall.

Plot

Cast
 Peggy Ryan as Eileen Rogan 
 Ray McDonald as Larry Hadden 
 Trudy Marshall as Carol Judson 
 Rick Vallin as Oliver Matthews 
 John Litel as Ralph Judson 
 Mary Gordon as Grandma Rogan 
 Tim Ryan as Uncle 
 James Burke as Michael Rogan 
 Lanny Simpson as Joey Rogan 
 Douglas Wood as Judge Mayer 
 Patsy Bolton as Patsy 
 Barbara Brier as Doris 
 Tim Graham as Officer Merrick

References

Bibliography
 David Bordwell. Reinventing Hollywood: How 1940s Filmmakers Changed Movie Storytelling. University of Chicago Press, 2017.

External links
 

1949 films
1949 musical comedy films
American black-and-white films
American musical comedy films
Eagle-Lion Films films
Films about Irish-American culture
Films directed by Arthur Dreifuss
Films scored by Herschel Burke Gilbert
Leprechaun films
American musical fantasy films
1940s English-language films
1940s American films